WR 22, also known as V429 Carinae or HR 4188, is an eclipsing binary star system in the constellation Carina.  The system contains a Wolf-Rayet (WR) star that is one of the most massive and most luminous stars known, and is also a bright X-ray source due to colliding winds with a less massive O class companion. Its eclipsing nature and apparent magnitude make it very useful for constraining the properties of luminous hydrogen-rich WR stars.

System
The WR 22 system contains two massive stars which orbit every 80 days.  The spectrum and luminosity are dominated by the primary, which has a spectral type of WN7h, indicating that it is a WR star on the nitrogen sequence, but also with hydrogen lines in its spectrum.  The secondary is an O9 star which appears to have the spectral luminosity class of a giant star, but the brightness of a main sequence star.

There is a shallow eclipse detectable when the primary passes in front of the secondary, which would be classed as the secondary eclipse. However, no primary eclipse is detected, which is believed to be due to the eccentricity of the system placing the stars further apart when the primary eclipse would occur. This strongly constrains the possible inclinations of the system.

Properties
The masses of the two stars can be determined fairly accurately because WR 22 is an eclipsing binary. It is one of the most massive star systems measured in this way rather than by assumptions about stellar evolution.

The temperature of both stars is high, but somewhat poorly defined.  The Wolf Rayet primary has a temperature of approximately 44,700 K derived from a model atmosphere fitting of the spectrum, and the secondary is assumed to have a temperature of 33,000 K which is typical for a star of its spectral type.

The brightness of the two stars cannot be measured separately, but the luminosity ratio can be calculated. The total system absolute magnitude, for a distance of 2.7 kpc and extinction of 1.12 magnitudes, is −6.85.

Evolution
High mass hydrogen-rich WR stars are young stars still burning hydrogen in their cores, rather than evolved stars fusing heavier elements. They show the WR characteristics of strong helium and nitrogen emission because they are strongly convective all the way to the core and have dredged up fusion products to the surface. It will soon exhaust the hydrogen in its core and evolve into a classical hydrogen-poor WR star, possibly after a period as a luminous blue variable then explode as a supernova. The secondary star is expected to have a more traditional evolution into a red supergiant in a few million years time.

References

Carina Nebula
Wolf–Rayet stars
Carinae, V429
Carina (constellation)
Durchmusterung objects
053208
4188
092740
O-type giants
Eclipsing binaries